The Image Mastering Application Programming Interface, or IMAPI, is a component of Microsoft Windows operating system used for CD and DVD authoring and recording.

Windows applications such as Windows Media Player, Windows Media Center, Windows Movie Maker, Windows DVD Maker, and Windows Explorer use IMAPI to create ISO 9660 and "burn" discs. Windows refers to discs created using IMAPI as Mastered burns in contrast to the term, Live File System which implies packet writing and does not use IMAPI.

Release history
IMAPI was originally introduced with Windows XP. IMAPI version 2.0 was released with Windows Vista and Windows Server 2008. On 26 June 2007, this version was released as an update for Windows XP and Windows Server 2003 after Microsoft received requests from hardware and software vendors.

On 19 January 2009, Microsoft released the Windows Feature Pack For Storage 1.0. This update allows IMAPI 2.0 to support Recordable Blu-ray Disc (BD-R) and Rewritable Blu-ray Disc (BD-RE) media. It also adds support for the Universal Disk Format (UDF) 2.5 file system. Windows Feature Pack for Storage is available for Windows XP or later and is integrated into Windows 7.

Overview
IMAPI provides the ability to create and burn single-session and multi-session discs, including bootable discs. It also provides low-level access to the burn engine for developing support for new devices, as well as access to extended recorder properties. IMAPI supports every major writable CD and DVD format including:
Compact discs
Recordable CD (CD-R). Formerly known as CD Write Once
Rewritable CD (CD-RW)
DVDs (IMAPI v2.0)
Recordable DVD (DVD-R and DVD+R)
Rewritable DVD (DVD-RW and DVD+RW)
Recordable dual layer DVD (DVD-R DL and DVD+R DL formats)
Random-access DVD (DVD-RAM)
Blu-ray discs (IMAPI v2.0 with Feature Pack for Storage)
Recordable Blu-ray Disc (BD-R)
Rewritable Blu-ray Disc (BD-RE)
Others
Disc-like media, such as Iomega REV
IMAPI supports writing disks in ISO 9660 (including CDDA Audio) and Joliet. IMAPI v2.0 also supports writing discs with Universal Disk Format file system.

IMAPI version 2.0 supports the following additional features:
 User-mode API instead of a kernel-mode API
 Support for multiple optical drives as well as simultaneously recording to multiple drives
 Support for creating ISO images
 Support for VBScript scripting
 Support for locking the recorder while burning

Unlike IMAPI version 1.0, IMAPI version 2.0 is implemented as a DLL rather than as a Windows service.

Shortcomings
IMAPI 2.0 suffers from some limitations, notably that will not allow a filesystem to be imported from a raw image (.iso file), only from an optical drive. In effect this means that while it can generate disk images, it cannot be used to modify them.

See also
 Features new to Windows XP
 SCSI Multimedia Commands

References

Windows components
Microsoft application programming interfaces